Jam Gems: Live at the Left Bank is  collaboration live album by trumpeter Freddie Hubbard and tenor saxophonist Jimmy Heath recorded at the Left Bank ballroom in Baltimore in June 1965 and released on the Label M label in 2001. It features performances by Hubbard, Heath, Gus Simms, Wilbur Little, and Bertell Knox.

Reception
The Allmusic review by Paula Edelstein states: "Jam Gems is jazz history documented at its finest and is a must-have for anyone interested in the energies and nuances of 'live' jazz in the '60s".

Track listing
 "All Members (incomplete)" (Jimmy Heath) - 4:01  
 "Bluesville" (Sonny Red Kyner) - 10:08  
 "Lover Man" (Jimmy Davis, Ram Ramirez, Jimmy Sherman) - 12:11  
 "What Is This Thing Called Love?" (Cole Porter) - 11:24  
 "Autumn Leaves" (Joseph Kosma, Johnny Mercer, Jacques Prévert) - 17:51  
Recorded by the Left Bank Jazz Society at the Famous Ballroom, Baltimore, Maryland on June 13, 1965

Personnel
Freddie Hubbard - trumpet
Jimmy Heath - tenor saxophone
Gus Simms - piano
Wilbur Little - bass 
Bertell Knox - drums

References

2001 live albums
Freddie Hubbard live albums
Jimmy Heath live albums